Colin Chapman (1928–1982) was an English design engineer, inventor, and builder in the automotive industry, and founder of Lotus Cars.

Colin Chapman may also refer to:
 Colin Chapman (cricketer) (born 1971), English cricketer
 Colin Chapman (primatologist), Canadian primatologist